Kninja may refer to:

 Kninjas
 K-Meleon#K-Ninja